Arthur is a surname. Notable people with the surname include:

Alex Arthur (born 1978), Scottish boxer
Alexander Arthur (1846–1912), Scottish-born engineer and entrepreneur in the United States
 Alexander Creighton Arthur, 19th century Member of Parliament in New Zealand
André Arthur (born 1943), Canadian politician and radio host
 Anthony Arthur (author) (1937–2009), American author
 Anthony Arthur (weightlifter) (born 1973), British weightlifter
Basil Arthur (1928–1985), New Zealand politician
Beatrice Arthur (1922–2009), American actor
 Ben Arthur (musician) (born 1973), American singer-songwriter
Benjamin Arthur (born 1982), American animator
Brad Arthur (born 1974), Australian rugby league football coach
Brigid Arthur (born 1934), Australian nun and litigation guardian
Carol Arthur (1935–2020), American actor
Charles Arthur (1808–1884), Australian cricketer
Charlie Arthur (1863–1924), Welsh rugby player
Chester A. Arthur (1829–1886), American politician and President of the United States
Christine Arthur (born 1963), New Zealand hockey player
Clara Arthur (1858–1929), American suffragist
Darrell Arthur (born 1988), American basketball player
Desmond Arthur (1884–1913), Irish aviator
Eric Arthur (1898–1982), Canadian architect
Fred Arthur (born 1961), Canadian ice hockey player
Frederick Arthur (1816–1878), British soldier
George Arthur (disambiguation), several people
Gordon Arthur (footballer) (born 1958), Scottish footballer
Gordon Arthur (bishop) (1909–1992), Anglican bishop in Australia
Graham Arthur (1936–2021), Australian football player
Harold J. Arthur (1904–1971), American politician
Indus Arthur (1941–1984), American actor
Isaac Arthur (born ), American YouTuber and futurist
James Arthur (disambiguation), several people
Jean Arthur (1900–1991), American actor
John Arthur (disambiguation), several people
Johnny Arthur (1883–1951), American actor
Joseph Arthur (born 1971), American singer-songwriter
Julia Arthur (1869–1950), Canadian actor
Kenny Arthur (born 1978), Scottish football player
Lyndon Arthur (born 1991), British boxer
Maureen Arthur (born 1934), American actor
Max Arthur (1939–2019), British military historian
Michael Arthur (disambiguation), several people
Oswald Raynor Arthur (1905–1973), British colonial administrator
Owen Arthur (born 1949), Barbadian politician
Portia Arthur (born 1990), Ghanaian writer
Rebeca Arthur (born 1960), American actor, known for her role in TV series Perfect Strangers
Revington Arthur (1908–1986), American painter and educator
Richard Arthur (Australian politician) (1865–1932), British-born physician and politician in Australia
Richard Arthur (British politician), leader of Camden London Borough Council 1993–2000
Richard Arthur (bishop) (–1646), Irish theological figure
Robert Arthur (disambiguation), several people
Stan Arthur (born 1936), American admiral
Thomas Arthur (disambiguation), several people
Timothy Shay Arthur (1809–1885), American author
Tom Arthur (rugby union) (1906–1986), Welsh rugby player
W. Brian Arthur (born 1945), British economist
Wilfred Arthur (1919–2000), Australian fighter ace
William Arthur (disambiguation), several people

See also
Arthur
Arthur baronets
MacArthur (surname)

English-language surnames
Scottish surnames